Mr. Lyndon at Liberty is a 1915 British silent thriller film directed by Harold M. Shaw and starring Edna Flugrath, Fred Groves and Charles Rock. It was based on the 1915 novel by Victor Bridges.

Plot summary
With the help of a secret service agent a man on the run is able to expose a respected Doctor as an enemy spy.

Cast
 Edna Flugrath -  Joyce Aylmer
 Fred Groves -  Tom Morrison
 Charles Rock - Doctor McMurtie
 S. Jensen - George Marwood
 Manora Thew -   Sonia Savoroff
 Harry Welchman -  Neil Lyndon

References

External links

1915 films
1910s thriller films
Films directed by Harold M. Shaw
Films based on British novels
British silent feature films
British black-and-white films
British thriller films
1910s English-language films
1910s British films
Silent thriller films